The Swarthmore Concert, subtitled King of the Blues, is a live album by the blues musician Lightnin' Hopkins, recorded at the Swarthmore College Folk Festival in 1965. It was originally released as part of the seven-CD box set Lightnin' Hopkins: The Complete Prestige/Bluesville Recordings, in 1991, before being reissued on Bluesville as a single CD in 1993.

Reception

AllMusic reviewer Cub Koda stated: "this languished unissued in Fantasy Records' vaults until its release in the early '90s. That's a shame, because this concert captures Lightnin' at his beguiling best, spinning tales and blues magic with every track. ... If you want a disc that clearly showcases Lightnin' Hopkins at his enchanting best, start your collection with this one; it's a charmer".

Track listing
All compositions by Sam "Lightnin'" Hopkins except where noted
 "Baby, Please Don't Go" (Traditional ) – 2:09
 "My Black Cadillac" – 1:44
 "It's Crazy" – 2:32
 "Mojo Hand" – 3:02
 "My Babe" (Willie Dixon) – 2:20
 "Short Haired Woman" – 3:52
 "Mean Old Frisco" (Arthur Crudup) – 1:53
 "Trouble in Mind" (Richard M. Jones) – 2:44
 "The Twister" – 3:04
 "Green Onion" – 1:31
 "Sun Goin' Down" – 3:20
 "Come Go Home with Me" – 2:28
 "I'm a Stranger" – 3:07

Personnel

Performance
Lightnin' Hopkins – guitar, vocals

References

1993 live albums
Lightnin' Hopkins live albums
Bluesville Records live albums